Geeks is a 2004 film that examines why people acquire an interest in "geeky" subjects such as Japanese Anime, Star Wars, Star Trek, and the film The Nightmare Before Christmas.

External links

2004 films
American documentary films
American independent films
Documentary films about fandom
2000s English-language films
2000s American films